Jacob Köbel (1462–1533) was a printer and publisher in Oppenheim.

Köbel graduated in arts and law from Heidelberg University in 1491. He appears to have then studied mathematics at Cracow, and is said to have been a fellow student of Copernicus there. He learnt the publishing trade as editor and proofreader for Heinrich Knoblochtzer in Heidelberg. In 1494 he married a woman from Oppenheim and settled there as secretary to the city council.

Works
 Geometrey, 1498
 Die Merfart vn[d] erfarung nüwer Schiffung, 1509. (This work is the illustrated travelogue of Balthasar Springer, who traveled in the Portuguese colonial expedition to Goa in 1505-06.)
 Elucidatio Fabricae Ususque Astrolabii, 1513

References

1462 births
1533 deaths
German printers
German publishers (people)